Draupathi is a 2020 Indian Tamil-language movie directed and produced by Mohan G. Kshatriyan. The film stars Richard Rishi and Sheela Rajkumar, with K. S. G. Venkatesh, Karunas, and Nishanth in supporting roles. The music of the film was composed by Jubin and cinematography was performed by Manoj Narayan and edited by Devaraj S. The film is a crowd funding project. It mostly received negative reviews from critics.

The movie was released amidst huge controversies, related to casteism. The film has been criticized for its alleged pro-casteism stand and intent to uphold casteism. It was also heavily criticised for its regressive storyline.

Cast 

 Richard Rishi as Rudra Prabhakaran
 Sheela Rajkumar as Draupathi, wife of Rudra
 Karunas as Advocate Guruthevan
 Nishanth as Arun
 Soundarya Nanjundan as Raniya
 Lena as Doctor
 Seshu as Register Neela Narayanan
 Aaru Bala as Prabakar's friend
 Jeeva Ravi as Advocate
 Ambani Shankar as Bhai
 Ilango as Karuna
 Gopinath as Senji Sekar
 Marumalarchi Bharathi as Ramasamy
 G. V. Kumar as Judge
 JSK Gopi as ACP Muruganandam
 Subramani
 Priya Asmitha in a special appearance for "Kanna Moochi" song

Production 
This film marks the second collaboration between the director Mohan and Richard Rishi after Pazhaya Vannarapettai. The film was shot in Chennai, Vellore, Viluppuram and Ariyalur and will be set in northern Tamil Nadu. The film had to be crowdfunded as no producer was willing to produce the film, fearing it would incite controversy.

Music 
The soundtrack of the film was composed by Jubin. The audio rights was secured by MRT Studios. The film's first single, titled Kanna Moochi Aatam which is sung by Velmurugan and lyrics by Pattinathar and Mohan G was released 9 October 2019. Another song Kukukukku song lyrics was written by Manikandan Priya.

Home media 
The satellite rights of the film were sold to Star Vijay.

Special screening 
Puducherry Governor and BJP leader Kiran Bedi celebrated womanhood by taking her housekeeping women for this movie. The movie was screened to political leaders S.Ramadoss of PMK and H.Raja of BJP political parties.

Reception

Critical reception 

Southfans gave 2 out of 5 stars and said "The film is made only with a single-minded narrative wherein the upper castes are shown in good light and the lower castes in a negative light."

The Wire wrote "'Draupathi' is not blasé. It is explicit about the deepest fears whispered in intermediate caste fraternities and social media."

Film companion called the movie as a regressive film and "Caste-porn".

Akshay Kumar of Dina Thanthi group in DTNEXT says "Director Mohan has walked the tight-rope of a social message movie laced with casteism and almost manages to make the film un-polarized."

Priyanka Thirumurthy of The News Minute gave it 1 out of 5 stars, claiming it was almost like the movie was "birthed on allegations by PMK Chief S Ramdoss" who claimed Dalit men were luring Vanniyar women with "jeans, T-shirts and fancy sunglasses" back in 2012 and said it is "a vile casteist film that was better off not made".

The Indian Express Navien Darshan gave the movie a 1.5/5, calling the movie for trying to "brainwash" what he called "a naeive audience possessing a shallow idea about casteism" and called out the directors for painting a single community (Dalits) as being the organizers of the marriage racket, closing by saying "the only thing people must be separated from is such works of hatred."

The Hindu's Srinivasa Ramanujan claimed the movie was "A bland outing that has very few cherishable moments," and called it "farcical" that the movie lasted 2.5 hours to show the audience a change in attitude, although he noted that the movie was not as blatantly casteist as the trailer made it out to be.

The Times of India critic M. Suganth gave it 2.5/5, claiming the first half had a "vigilante thriller" vibe and was interesting, but the second half became more about a message and the story got lost in narration.

Sify.com gave it 2/5, claiming that Draupathi is an average drama shedding light on an unknown crime in society.

Indiaglitz gave 2.5/5 stating that "What works best in 'Draupathi' is the first half which plays out like a murder mystery thriller with a vigilante touch."

Behindwoods rated 2.25/5 stating that "The film focuses on a serious problem of fraudulent legal marriages but fails to deliver the desired impact due to the wrongful stereotyping of a particular group".

Ananda Vikatan gave the film a rating of 29 marks out of 100, the magazine's lowest rating given to a film in the past 20 years.

BJP leader H Raja and PMK leader Ramadoss,  AIADMK Minister K. T. Rajenthra Bhalaji watched the movie, and he has tweeted praising Draupadi as a good awareness movie for women and parents, and appreciated the team.

Audience 

The movie was received with frenzy by Pattali Makkal Katchi cadres. Banners with slogans "Here comes Draupadi to save the women of all communities," are erected in theatres in Trichy. The movie found support from the PMK and BJP. PMK cadre and functionaries filled up the theatres on the opening day, in some places even posters were put up to make it clear that the film has the approval of PMK founder S Ramadoss.

A video went viral where a  young man outside a cinema theatre after watching Draupathi said "If my sister falls in love with someone from a different caste, I will kill the guy or my sister" and a group of men cheer him on as if he's just made a revolutionary statement.

Many Vanniyars, as well as members of social groupings who share the film's cultural anxieties, have praised it. The movie was also lauded by Bharatiya Janata Party (BJP) politician H. Raja. While numerous films in Tamil cinema praise the Thevars and Gounders, as well as the Brahmins, the Vanniyars have been virtually ignored. For Vanniyar zealots, this is a watershed event since, after Marumalarchi (1998), Draupathi is the first film to overtly represent Vanniyars as assertive.

Allegations of casteism 
Social activists and rationalists claimed that the movie is speaking in favour of caste and is supporting honour killing.

According to assistant professor of political science at the Centre for Studies in Social Sciences, Calcutta, Karthick Ram Manoharan, the villain of the film is a political leader who and his hench men are involved in the fake marriage racket.Some commentators say, resembles the prominent Dalit leader Thirumavalavan, though Mohan G has denied this. In the movie, Draupathi's uncle advises that if Dalits enter the village, they should be thrashed. The film employs a slew of confusing connections to obscure its casteist plot and portrays all Dalit men as lechers and prone to criminal activities. The film makes a vague reference to Ilavarasan case and calls it a fake incident orchestrated by Dalits and that the honor killings in general are actually pre-meditated suicides plotted by  Dalit political outfits who gain political mileage through such incidents. The film shows corporates using Dalits, who are depicted unscrupulous right from their birth in the film, to subvert traditional lifestyle and values and that the Dalits have no dignity and respectable traditions. The fake marriage racket is shown as a means  to break the caste hierarchy and it is frequently cited in film that caste system is good and that the most we can aspire is to lessen violence while maintaining caste hierarchy, endogamy,ban on Dalits to enter certain temples ,separate neighborhoods for Dalits and kangaroo courts that punish Dalits violently for transgressing rules imposed by other castes . According to Manoharan, this portrayal reflects fear, or what MSS Pandian refers to as the "falling dominance of intermediary castes," or the difficulty of such castes to accept Dalit mobility. Mohan G portrays the Vanniyars as people with royal lineage, who are righteous by birth and honor both women(Penn) and the land(mann), while Dalits as traitors and anti-social elements who were ostracized because of their supposed innate immoral nature . Female characters are portrayed  mostly submissive to the patriarchy.

According to Film Companion, the film depicts endogamy is the ideal marriage while inter-caste marriage ,although undesirable and better be avoided, should only be approved if it happens between members of non-Dalit castes.The film shows women who date Dalit men in poor light and shows them as gullible, easy to have sex with while the women practicing endogamy are portrayed to be wiser,chaste and brave. Apart from vilifying lower castes, it also vilifies Brahmins and foreign corporates who collude with lower castes for economic gain. Dalit men are shown as lecherous, lazy and drug addicts who try to date Vanniyar women  to improve their social-economic status. In one scene, Draupathi is shown walking through fields and criticising the MNREGA programme for making landless Dalit men lazy and asserting that Panchami land given to Dalits should be appropriated by upper castes . Marriage between Dalit men and non-Dalit women is frequently cited as the most serious problem faced by intermediary castes. The Brahmin registrar is said to have performed 3200 fake marriages. However, the film makes no mention of how the same system could have endorsed real lovers from different castes.

India Today reported that Mohan G believes that many cases of honour killings are false, and this belief is expressed explicitly in some scenes and dialogues.

Influence of Vanniyar Sangham 
The movie contains enough symbolic representations to indicate that the plot revolves around the Vanniyar community. A character has a ring tone that plays the song 'Maaveeraney,' which caused an uproar in the theatre. The supporters of late Vanniyar Sangam leader Kaduvetti Guru referred to him as Maaveeran. Furthermore, several young people in the film are seen wearing yellow t-shirts with Vanniyar Sangham symbols.

Controversy 
The trailer of the film, which was released with the caption "Jaathigal ulathadi paapa" which translates to "caste exists, my child " created a controversy in Tamil Nadu. The scenes in the trailer are designed to justify manslaughter. The verses where Karunas says ‘Kill whoever you want’, ‘Soil and women are very important to us. The verse in which Susila says, "We will cut off the hand of anyone who touches it" became a controversy. Many who commented below the trailer openly mentioned their caste name and said ‘Congratulations on the success of the film on behalf of our caste’ as well as depicting certain castes as inferior to them.

The film's trailer has drawn a lot of criticism for portraying Thol. Thirumavalavan, the founder of Viduthalai Chiruthaigal Katchi, as the leader of the "fake love" racket and for including provocative statements against inter-caste marriage. In the film, an allegedly criminal character claims that their commander instructed him to chant "Adanga Maru, Aththu Meeru," a political slogan popularised by Thirumavalavan. The similarities between the figure in the film and real-life politicians, on the other hand, were unintentional, according to Mohan G Kshatriyan.

References

External links 
 

2020 action drama films
2020s Tamil-language films
Films about the caste system in India
Indian action drama films
Indian films based on actual events